Charles William Morris (23 August 1879 – 9 April 1959) was a British featherweight boxer who competed in the early twentieth century. He won a silver medal in Boxing at the 1908 Summer Olympics.

References

1879 births
1959 deaths
Olympic boxers of Great Britain
Featherweight boxers
Olympic silver medallists for Great Britain
Boxers at the 1908 Summer Olympics
Place of birth missing
Olympic medalists in boxing
British male boxers
Medalists at the 1908 Summer Olympics